The 1932 Holy Cross Crusaders football team was an American football team that represented the College of the Holy Cross as an independent during the 1932 college football season.  
Holy Cross was led by third-year head coach John McEwan for the first seven games of the season. McEwan was suspended and ultimately fired after an argument with the team's trainer, Bart Sullivan, during Holy Cross's loss to Brown on November 5. Art Corcoran served as the team's interim head coach for the final three games of the season. Holy Cross finished the year with an overall record of 6–2–2. The Crusaders played their home games at Fitton Field in Worcester, Massachusetts.

Schedule

References

Holy Cross
Holy Cross Crusaders football seasons
Holy Cross Crusaders football